MI-11 or variant may represent:

 Michigan's 11th congressional district
 M-11 (Michigan highway)
 MI11, British Military Intelligence section 11
 Xiaomi Mi 11, an Android smartphone